Goganpani, Bheri is a village development committee in Dailekh District in the Bheri Zone of western-central Nepal. At the time of the 1991 Nepal census, it had a population of 2574 people living in 449 individual households.

References

External links
UN map of the municipalities of Dailekh District

Populated places in Dailekh District